The Under Secretary of the Air Force (USECAF, or SAF/US), sometimes referred to as the Under Secretary of the Department of the Air Force, is the second-highest ranking civilian official in the Department of the Air Force of the United States of America, serving directly under the Secretary of the Air Force. In the absence of the Secretary, the Under Secretary exercises all the powers and duties of the Secretary and serves as Acting Secretary when the position of Secretary is vacant. The Under Secretary of the Air Force is appointed by the President, by and with the advice and consent of the Senate.

The Secretary and Under Secretary, together with two military officers (the Chief of Staff of the Air Force and the Chief of Space Operations), constitute the senior leadership team of the Department of the Air Force.

The Under Secretary of the Air Force supervises the following officials:
Assistant Secretary of the Air Force (Acquisition, Technology and Logistics)
Assistant Secretary of the Air Force (Financial Management & Comptroller)
Assistant Secretary of the Air Force (Installations, Environment & Energy)
Assistant Secretary of the Air Force (Manpower & Reserve Affairs)
Assistant Secretary of the Air Force (Space Acquisition & Integration)
General Counsel of the Department of the Air Force
Deputy Under Secretary of the Air Force (Management) and Deputy Chief Management Officer

List of Under Secretaries of the Air Force

See also
 Leadership of the National Reconnaissance Office

References

Sources
 HAF MISSION DIRECTIVE 1–2, UNDER SECRETARY OF THE AIR FORCE, 8 SEPTEMBER 2008, accessed on 2011-01-10.
 Department of Defense Key Officials 1947–2004. Washington, D.C.: Historical Office, Office of the Secretary of Defense, 2004
 Office of the Secretary of the Air Force – Organizational and Functional Charts 1947–1984. Washington, D.C.; Office of Air Force History, 1985
 Report To The Congress – Use of Missile Procurement Funds To Finance Research And Development Efforts – B-146876. Washington, D.C.; Comptroller General of the United States, 1969
 Watson, George M., Office of the Secretary of the Air Force 1947–65. Washington, D.C.; Center for Air Force History, 1993

External links
 United States Air Force biography

United States Air Force